Fazal Elahi Chaudhry (1 January 1904 – 2 June 1982) was a Pakistani politician who served as the fifth president of Pakistan from 1973 until 1978, prior to the martial law led by Chief of Army Staff General Zia-ul-Haq. He also served as the deputy speaker of the National Assembly of Pakistan from 1965 to 1969 and the eighth speaker of the National Assembly of Pakistan from 1972 to 1973.

Early life
Fazal Elahi Chaudhry was born on 1 January 1904 into an influential Gujjar family in Marala village, near the city of Kharian, Gujrat District in Punjab Province. After receiving his education from there, Chaudhry joined the prestigious Aligarh Muslim University in 1920, receiving his LLB in Civil law in 1924. Thereafter, Chaudhry returned to Punjab and attended the Punjab University's post-graduate school in law and political science. In 1925, Chaudhry obtained his MA in Political Science in 1925, and the advanced LLM in Law and Justice, in 1927.

After completing his education, Chaudhry established his law firm in Lahore, advocating for the civil law and liberties, and went back to Gujrat and started practising the civil law.

Political career

Early years (1942-1956) 
In 1930, Chaudhry started taking interest in politics and participated in the 1930 Indian general election for the Gujrat District Board and was elected unopposed. He joined the Muslim League in 1942. In 1945, he was elected from Gujrat as the President of Muslim League. He took part in the 1946 Indian provincial elections on Muslim League's ticket and played an important role in propagating the ideas of the Muslim League among the people of his area. Upon the independence of Pakistan, he was given the post of Parliamentary Secretary, and was included in Liaquat Ali Khan's cabinet, serving as the education and health minister. 

He further joined Pakistan permanent representative's delegation to the United Nations in 1951. In 1951, he contested the elections of the Punjab Legislative Assembly on the Muslim League ticket and was elected as a member of the Punjab Assembly. In 1952, he represented Pakistan in the United Nations.

Speaker and deputy speaker roles (1956-1972) 
In the 1956 elections, he was elected as member of the West Pakistan Assembly. Chaudhry served as the first Speaker of the West Pakistan Legislative Assembly from 20 May 1956 to 7 October 1958. In 1962, when Ayub Khan announced the elections, he was selected as the Deputy Opposition Leader of the House on the basis of his experience and knowledge about parliamentary proceedings. Chaudhry joined the Convention Muslim League, and after the 1965 presidential election, he was elected as the Deputy Speaker of the National Assembly, a role he served in till 1969.

He was elected as member of the National Assembly in 1970 on the ticket of the Pakistan Peoples Party, and was later elected as the Speaker of the National Assembly in 1972. He ended up joining the Pakistan Peoples Party.

President of Pakistan (1973-1978) 
He contested the Presidential Elections of 1973 against Khan Amirzadah Khan of NAP and all opposition parties, and was elected President in 1973 (receiving 139 votes against Khan's 45), when the head of the PPP, Zulfiqar Ali Bhutto was made Prime Minister. He was the first Punjabi President of Pakistan.

Chaudhry was largely a figurehead, and was the first Pakistani President with less power than the Prime Minister. This was due to the new constitution of 1973 that gave more powers to the Prime Minister. Previously, the President had been the chief executive of Pakistan and had the power to appoint Prime Minister. After Operation Fair Play - a codename of the operation to remove Zulfikar Ali Bhutto from power - Chaudhry continued his presidency but had no influence in the government operations or the military and national affairs.

After contentious relations with the military, Chaudhry decided to resign from his post despite the urging of the Chief of Army Staff and Chairman of Joint Chiefs of Staff. On 16 September 1978, Chaudhry handed the charge of the presidency to ruling military general Zia-ul-Haq who succeeded him as the sixth president, in addition to being the Chief Martial Law Administrator and the Chief of Army Staff.

Death
Chaudhry died of a heart ailment on 2 June 1982 at the age of 78.

References

External links
Chronicles Of Pakistan

|-

1904 births
1982 deaths
Aligarh Muslim University alumni
First Pakistani Cabinet
Pakistan Movement activists
People from Kharian
Presidents of Pakistan
Pakistani landowners
Speakers of the National Assembly of Pakistan
University of the Punjab alumni
Pakistan People's Party politicians
Faculty of Law, Aligarh Muslim University alumni
Deputy Speakers of the National Assembly of Pakistan
Pakistani MNAs 1972–1977
Pakistani MNAs 1962–1965
Punjab, Pakistan MLAs 1951–1955
Members of the Provincial Assembly of West Pakistan
Speakers of the Provincial Assembly of West Pakistan